Slatersville Reservoir is a large lake in the village of Slatersville in the town of North Smithfield in Providence County, Rhode Island. 

The Slatersville Reservoir was created for use by the nearby Slater family's textile mills when a "larger dam, known as the Middle Dam, was built in 1849. Behind the dam is the  Lower Slatersville Reservoir. The smaller dam was built later to increase the water power. The sluice gate here controlled the amount of water flowing into the raceway that powered the Slatersville Mill." The two dams, which now create waterfalls, can be seen from the North Smithfield Public Library.

See also
List of lakes in Rhode Island

References

Lakes of Rhode Island